Cupressus torulosa, commonly known as the Himalayan cypress or Bhutan cypress,  is a species of cypress tree native to the mountainous northern regions of the Indian subcontinent, primarily the Himalayas.

Distribution
Information on its distribution further east is conflicting. It may occur in Vietnam. However, according to Conifers of Vietnam, only cultivated forms exist in Vietnam, and the Flora of China reports it from Tibet.

References

External links

torulosa
Flora of India (region)
Flora of Tibet
Plants described in 1824
Least concern plants
Least concern biota of Asia